Gloria del Carmen Montenegro Rizzardini is a botanist, biologist, academic and scientist. She is Professor of Botany at the Pontificia Universidad Católica de Chile. She won the  L'Oréal-UNESCO Awards for Women in Science in 1998. She has undertaken pioneering work in botany and conservation of native flora, using scientific approaches to protect plant ecosystems.

References 

Chilean women scientists
Living people
21st-century Chilean botanists
Chilean women botanists
L'Oréal-UNESCO Awards for Women in Science laureates
21st-century women scientists
Year of birth missing (living people)